H21 or H-21 may refer to:

 British NVC community H21, a type of heath community in the British National Vegetation Classification
 Highway H21 (Ukraine)
 , a Royal Navy H-class submarine
 , a Royal Navy S-class destroyer
 Mata Hari (1876–1917), German spy code named H-21
 Piasecki H-21, an American helicopter
 Institute H21, a Czech think tank that created the website Prezident 21